Edmund Bourke (died 1738) was an Irish Dominican.

Born in Galway during the second half of the 17th century, joining the Order of Preachers in that county where he began his studies before leaving for Spain where he completed them. He is noted as the author of numerous scholarly works, though none of them have been traced. In 1706 he was principal regent of the Irish Dominican school in Louvain. He died in Rome about 1738.

See also

 Dominicans in Ireland

References

 Galway Authors, Helen Maher, 1976.

1738 deaths
People from County Galway
Irish Dominicans
Irish writers
17th-century births